Carl Tschek (? - 1872) was an Austrian entomologist who specialised in Ichneumonidae

Carl Tschek was a factory manager in Piesting. His collection which includes the types of the new species he described is in the Naturhistorisches Museum, in Vienna.

Selected works
1868 Beiträge zur Kenntniss der oesterreichischen Pimplarien. Verhandlungen der Zoologisch-Botanischen Gesellschaft in Wien
1868. Beiträge zur Kenntniss der oesterreichischen Tryphoniden. Verhandlungen der Zoologisch-Botanischen Gesellschaft in Wien
1870. Beiträge zur Kenntniss der österrei-chischen Cryptoiden. Verhandlungen der Zoologisch-Botanischen Gesellschaft in Wien 20:109-156
1871. Beiträge zur Kenntnis der österreichischen Cryptoiden. Verhandlungen der Zoologisch-Botanischen Gesellschaft in Wien 20:109–156
1871. Ichneumonologische Fragmente Verhandlungen der Zoologisch-Botanischen Gesellschaft in Wien

References
Verhandlungen des Zoologisch-Botanischen Vereins in Wien 1873 [Obituary notice]

Austrian entomologists
Year of birth missing
1872 deaths